{{Speciesbox
| name = Triangular kidneyshell
| image = 
| status = EN 
| status_system = IUCN3.1
| status_ref = 
| genus = Ptychobranchus
| species = greenii
| authority = (Conrad, 1834)
| synonyms = Unio brumbyanusUnio brumbleyanusUnio flavescensUnio foremanianusUnio greeniiUnio simplexUnio trinacrusUnio woodwardianusUnio woodwardius}}

The triangular kidneyshell (Ptychobranchus greenii) is a species of freshwater mussel, in the family Unionidae, the river mussels. It is endemic to Alabama in the United States, where it is known from several rivers and streams in the Mobile River Basin. It is a federally listed endangered species of the United States.

This aquatic bivalve mollusc is somewhat oval in shape and may reach 10 centimeters in length. It is yellow to yellow-brown in color. The shell is quite variable in appearance.

When this mussel breeds it releases its larvae, termed glochidia, glued together in packets called conglutinates. The conglutinate has a sticky filament that adheres to the substrate to prevent it from being washed away. The conglutinate resembles a fly larva, or perhaps a fish egg, and it is appetizing to fish. Fish hosts such as the warrior darter (Etheostoma bellator), Tuskaloosa darter (Etheostoma douglasi), and blackbanded darter (Percina nigrofasciata) consume the conglutinates, degrading them and releasing the glochidia, which then lodge in the fish's gills as parasites. They develop into juvenile mussels and drop out of the fish to develop further elsewhere. Many other mussels in family Unionidae have a similar process.

This mussel was known from the Black Warrior River and tributaries, the Coosa River and its tributaries, and the Cahaba River. When it was placed on the Endangered Species List in 1993 it was limited to some tributaries of the Black Warrior River and the Conasauga River in the Coosa River drainage. Any remaining specimens in the Cahaba River are now treated as members of another species, Ptychobranchus foremanianus''. It is extirpated from the main Black Warrior River, but it is present in at least two tributaries, which are protected within Bankhead National Forest.

References

Ptychobranchus
Molluscs of the United States
Endemic fauna of Alabama
Bivalves described in 1834
ESA endangered species
Taxonomy articles created by Polbot